Ryosuke Yamamoto may refer to:

, Japanese actor and model
, Japanese triathlete